The National Indigenous Music Awards 2018 are the 15th annual National Indigenous Music Awards.

The nominations were announced on 9 July 2018 and the awards ceremony was held on 11 August 2018.

2018 was seen as a strong year for Indigenous music with an ARIA number 1 album, national tours, Eurovision Song Contest performance appearances, Triple J Hottest 100, 2018 placements and acts playing festivals across the country. The 2018 National Indigenous Music Awards saw a growth in both audience and nominations.

NIMA Reference Group Chair Warren H. Williams said "The growth in the National Indigenous Music Awards has mirrored the growth of Indigenous music more generally over the last fifteen years. As our musicians have continued their journey of taking their rightful place at the forefront of Australian music, the awards have been there not just to celebrate their successes, but to be a launching pad for new talent and discovery vehicle for musicians, whether they are from Darwin, Devonport, Derby, Dubbo or the Daintree."

Performers
 Baker Boy
 Busby Marou
 Kasey Chambers with Alan Pigram
 Roger Knox
 Alice Skye
 Kardajala Kirridarra
 Yirrmal
 Kenbi Dancers
 Central Australian Aboriginal Women's Choir
 Stiff Gins

Hall of Fame inductee
 Roger Knox

Roger Knox has career spanning over three decades, from his debut album Give It a Go in 1984 to Stranger in My Land in 2013. Australian Music Vault Senior Curator, Carolyn Laffan, said "For more than thirty years Roger's music has brought joy and healing to audiences in remote areas of Australia, in prisons and correctional centres and at festivals across Australia and North America."

Triple J Unearthed National Indigenous Winner
 Alice Skye

Alice Skye is a 22 year old Wergaia and Wamba Wamba woman based in Melbourne. She grew up in the Grampians in country Victoria. Her songwriting often reflects the calming mountain landscape that she calls home.
Skye uploaded "Poetry By Text" in November 2017 followed by "Friends with Feelings" in April 2018 onto Triple J Unearthed.

Special Recognition award
 Central Australian Aboriginal Women's Choir

Awards
Artist of the Year

New Talent of the Year

Album of the Year

Film Clip of the Year

Song of the Year

Community Clip of the Year

References

2018 in Australian music
2018 music awards
National Indigenous Music Awards